In mathematics, von Neumann's theorem is a result in the operator theory of linear operators on Hilbert spaces.

Statement of the theorem

Let  and  be Hilbert spaces, and let  be an unbounded operator from  into  Suppose that  is a closed operator and that  is densely defined, that is,  is dense in  Let  denote the adjoint of  Then  is also densely defined, and it is self-adjoint. That is,

and the operators on the right- and left-hand sides have the same dense domain in

References

Operator theory
Theorems in functional analysis